Lucas dos Santos Rocha da Silva (born 15 July 1991), known as Lucas or Lucas Rocha, is a Brazilian professional footballer who plays as a defender for Brasilian club Amazonas.

Career
A youth graduate from Portuguesa, his performances at early age led to a move abroad, joining Bayer Leverkusen on 17 July 2010, signing a two-year deal, while finishing the season at Portuguesa. In January 2011, he moved on a loan deal to 1. FC Kaiserslautern, but did not make an appearance.

A free agent, he joined Vasas on 4 September 2012, playing 19 games as starter, scoring once. A year later, he moved, this time to Kaposvár in the Hungarian league.
On 27 June 2014, Lucas Rocha moved to his fourth club in same number of years, joining Boavista in Portugal.

References

External links

1991 births
Living people
Footballers from São Paulo
Brazilian footballers
Association football defenders
Associação Portuguesa de Desportos players
Nemzeti Bajnokság I players
Primeira Liga players
Liga Portugal 2 players
Campeonato Brasileiro Série D players
Championnat National 2 players
V.League 1 players
Bayer 04 Leverkusen players
1. FC Kaiserslautern players
Vasas SC players
Kaposvári Rákóczi FC players
Boavista F.C. players
US Lusitanos Saint-Maur players
Clube Atlético Juventus players
Brazilian expatriate footballers
Brazilian expatriate sportspeople in Germany
Expatriate footballers in Germany
Brazilian expatriate sportspeople in Hungary
Expatriate footballers in Hungary
Brazilian expatriate sportspeople in Portugal
Expatriate footballers in Portugal
Brazilian expatriate sportspeople in France
Expatriate footballers in France
Brazilian expatriate sportspeople in Vietnam
Expatriate footballers in Vietnam
Amazonas Futebol Clube players